This is a list of organisations in South Australian providing support mainly to people with developmental disability and acquired disability, rather than disabilities arising from mental disorder. With the start of the National Disability Insurance Scheme (NDIS) responsibility for services to people with disability has been taken on by the NDIS.

Support for children
Ted Mullighan QC, as Commissioner for the Children in State Care Commission of Inquiry, noted that children with disabilities were generally supported by non-government agencies, the Government of South Australia facilitated residential and associated care by non-government agencies contributing funds and subsidies. However children and adolescents with disabilities were also placed and restrained of children in adult mental hospitals from the mid 19th century to the mid 20th century. The State opened Lochiel Park Boys Training Centre in 1958 and the Strathmont Centre in March 1971. The report included 54 recommendations, intended to improve many aspects of children in care.

The Centre stayed open with dwindling resident numbers until 2020, after which Renewal SA announced plans to redevelop the Oakden and Gilles Plains areas.

Support for adults

List of organisations

References

External links

South Australia